The Shaan–Jing pipeline is a natural gas pipeline in China, which runs from Jingbian County to Beijing and Tianjin.

History
The construction of pipeline started in March 1996 and was completed on 10 September 1997. The Parallel Shaan-Jing Pipeline was completed and put into operation on 20 July 2005.

Route
The first pipeline starts from the gas processing plant in Changqing gas field, in Shaanxi province, and terminates in the Yamenkou terminal in Shijingshan district, Beijing. It supplies natural gas to Shanxi, Hebei, Beijing and Tianjin. It also supplies The Cangzhou Fertilizer Plant and Shandong Zibo area through Gang-Cang and Cang-Zi lines.

The Parallel Shaan-Jing Pipeline is supplied from the Sulige Gas Field and it starts from the gas processing plant Yulin, Shaanxi. The pipeline runs via Shijiazhuang to Beijing.  By the Ji-Ning branch between the Qingshan and Anping distributing stations the Parallel Shaan-Jing Pipeline is connected to the West–East Gas Pipeline.  It is also connected with the underground gas storage of Dagang Oilfield by Gang-Jing line and Gang-Qing line.

Technical features
The annual capacity of this pipeline is after several upgradings 4 billion cubic meters of natural gas. The pipeline includes three compressor stations and three underground storage facilities.

The capacity of the Parallel Shaan-Jing Pipeline is 12 bcm.

Operator
The pipeline is operated by Beijing Huayou Gas Company. The Parallel Shaan-Jing Pipeline is operated by PetroChina.

See also

 West–East Gas Pipeline
 Sichuan–Shanghai gas pipeline
 Zhongxian–Wuhan Pipeline

References

Natural gas pipelines in China